Althéa Laurin (born 1 September 2001) is a French taekwondo athlete.

She is the 2021 bronze medallist in the women +67 kg at the Tokyo Olympic Games and is also decorated Knight of the National Order of Merit.

She won the gold medal in her event at the 2022 European Taekwondo Championships held in Manchester, United Kingdom.

Career
She won the European Taekwondo Junior Championships in Larnaca and the Women's Light Heavyweight -68 kg at the 2018 Junior World Championship in Hammamet. She made her Olympic debut representing France at the 2020 Summer Olympics.

She was selected for the Taekwondo at the 2020 Summer Olympics – Women's +67 kg where she defeated Briseida Acosta in the opening round and Zheng Shuyin in the second round.
She overcame Aminata Traoré in the repechage to secure a bronze Olympic medal.

She won one of the bronze medals in the women's +67 kg event at the 2022 Mediterranean Games held in Oran, Algeria.

References

External links
 

2001 births
Living people
Taekwondo practitioners at the 2020 Summer Olympics
French female taekwondo practitioners
Olympic taekwondo practitioners of France
Olympic bronze medalists for France
Olympic medalists in taekwondo
Medalists at the 2020 Summer Olympics
Mediterranean Games silver medalists for France
Mediterranean Games bronze medalists for France
Mediterranean Games medalists in taekwondo
Competitors at the 2018 Mediterranean Games
Competitors at the 2022 Mediterranean Games
European Taekwondo Championships medalists
21st-century French women